The Baky (Bakı) is a river in the Sakha Republic (Yakutia), Russia. It is one of the northern tributaries of the Yana.

The river flows north of the Arctic Circle. Its basin falls within Verkhoyansky District.

Course
The Baky is a left tributary of the Yana. It has its sources in the northwestern slopes of the Khayrdakh Ridge (Хайырдахский кряж), part of the Kular Range of the Verkhoyansk system. The river flows first northeastwards, skirting the mountain area. It meanders within a wide valley heading in an eastern direction in its lower course. Osokhtokh village is located by the banks of the Baky in its last stretch, where the river meanders very strongly. Near the left bank of the Yana the Baky divides into three branches, joining the river  from its mouth.

Tributaries 
There are 80 lakes in the river basin. The river is frozen between late September or early October and late May or early June.

See also
List of rivers of Russia

References

External links 
Fishing & Tourism in Yakutia

Tributaries of the Yana River
Rivers of the Sakha Republic
Verkhoyansk Range
East Siberian Lowland